Vikram Dharma (born as R. N. Dharmaseelan in 1956 – 28 June 2006) was an Indian action choreographer in the Tamil film industry (also known as Kollywood) in Indian cinema. He won the Filmfare Award for Best Action for Yuva. He was the son of fight master R. N. Nambiar who was known for his works in MGR's movies. He worked with actor Kamal Haasan in many films. His working name of "Vikram" was assigned to him once he became acted in Kamal Haasan's movie of the same name in 1986. Stunt masters and Actors like Ponnambalam, Thalapathy Dinesh, K. Ganesh Kumar, Ram Laxman, Anbariv, Mahanadi Shankar, Besant Ravi, Rajendran, T. Ramesh, Indian Baskar, Rajasekhar and Sai Dheena have worked as fighters and assistants to him. He died of a heart attack in early 2006.

Filmography

 1987 Vairagyam
 1988 Sathya
 1988 Poovukkul Boogambam
 1988 En Thangai Kalyani
 1988 Jeeva
 1988 Puthiya Vaanam
 1988 Soora Samhaaram
 1988 Thaimel Aanai
 1988 Poovizhi Raja
 1988 Dhayam Onnu
 1988 Katha Nayagan
 1988 Kalicharan
 1988 Kaliyugam
 1989 Kuttravali
 1989 Apoorva Sagodharargal
 1989 Vettaiyaadu Vilaiyaadu
 1989 Padicha Pulla
 1989 En Thangai
 1989 Andru Peytha Mazhaiyil
 1989 Annanukku Jai
 1989 Chinnappadass
 1989 Uthama Purushan
 1989 Vetri Vizha
 1989 Vetri Mel Vetri
 1989 Thiruppu Munai
 1990 Arangetra Velai
 1990 Madurai Veeran Enga Saami
 1990 Kizhakku Vasal
 1990 Ooru Vittu Ooru Vanthu
 1990 Naangal Pudhiyavargal
 1990 My Dear Marthandan
 1990 Michael Madana Kama Rajan
 1990 Sathriyan
 1990 Nadigan
 1990 Urudhi Mozhi
 1990 Raja Kaiya Vacha
 1991 Dharma Dorai
 1991 Vaakku Moolam
 1991 Thambikku Oru Paattu
 1991 Ayul Kaithi
 1991 Bramma
 1991 Guna
 1991 Paattondru Ketten
 1992 Amaran
 1992 Rickshaw Mama
 1992 Unnai Vaazhthi Paadugiren
 1992 Singaravelan
 1992 Amma Vanthachu
 1992 Magudam
 1992 Naalaya Seidhi
 1992 Pangali
 1992 Thevar Magan
 1992 Thirumathi Palanisamy
 1993 Walter Vetrivel
 1993 Dasarathan
 1993 Kalaignan
 1993 Ulle Veliye
 1993 Pudhiya Mugam
 1993 Uzhaippali
 1993 Dharmaseelan
 1993 Gentleman
 1993 Uzhavan
 1993 Rojavai Killathe
 1994 Mahanadhi
 1994 Rajakumaran
 1994 Magalir Mattum
 1994 Adharmam
 1994 Vietnam Colony
 1994 Kadhalan
 1994 Nammavar
 1994 Pavithra
 1995 Sathi Leelavathi
 1995 Chinna Vathiyar
 1995 Indira
 1995 Kuruthipunal
 1996 Love Birds
 1996 Mahaprabhu
 1996 Indian
 1996 Kadhal Desam
 1996 Thuraimugam
 1996 Nethaji
 1997 Minsara Kanavu
 1997 Nesam
 1997 Ullaasam
 1997 Abhimanyu
 1997 Nerrukku Ner
 1997 Ratchagan
 1997 Roja Malare
 1998 Kadhala Kadhala
 1999 Ninaivirukkum Varai
 1999 Kadhalar Dhinam
 2000 Eazhaiyin Sirippil
 2000 Hey Ram!
 2000 Kandukondain Kandukondain
 2000 Kushi
 2000 Appu
 2000 Sabhash
 2000 Thenali
 2001 Nila Kaalam
 2001 Little John
 2001 Asathal
 2001 12B
 2001 Aalavandhan
 2002 Pammal K. Sambandam
 2002 Kannathil Muthamittal
 2002 123
 2002 Panchathanthiram
 2002 Baba
 2002 Aadi
 2002 Samurai
 2002 Hey! Nee Romba Azhaga Irukke
 2002 University
 2002 Kadhal Virus
 2003 Anbe Sivam
 2003 Nala Damayanthi
 2003 Boys
 2003 Iyarkai
 2004 Virumaandi
 2004 Udhaya
 2004 Arul
 2004 Yuva
 2004 Aaytha Ezhuthu
 2004 Vasool Raja MBBS
 2004 Chellamae
 2004 Vishwa Thulasi
 2005 Mumbai Xpress
 2005 Maayavi
 2005 Ullam Ketkumae
 2006 Paramasivan
 2006 Idhaya Thirudan
 2006 Thambi
 2006 Sillunu Oru Kaadhal
 2007 Kuttrapathirikai
 2007 Unnale Unnale
 2007 Urchagam

Actor

 1983 Adutha Varisu as Rogue (special appearance) (Credited as Dharmaseelan)
 1983 Thoongadhey Thambi Thoongadhey as Peter (Credited as Dharmaseelan)
 1983 Naan Soottiya Malaras Peter (Credited as Dharman)
 1983 Thangaikkor Geetham as Henchman (special appearance) (Credited as Dharmaseelan)
 1984 Kai Kodukkum Kai as Henchman (special appearance) (Credited as Dharmaseelan)
 1984 Thambikku Entha Ooru as Rogue (special appearance) (Credited as Dharmaseelan)
 1984 Madurai Sooran as Dharma (in a special appearance as a CID officer)
 1985 Raja Yuvaraja as Shetty (Credited as Dharmaseelan)
 1986 Jeevanadhi as Rogue (special appearance) (Credited as Dharman)
 1986 Dharma Devathai as Henchman (special appearance) (Credited as Dharmaseelan)
 1986 Kaalamellam Un Madiyil as Rogue (Credited as Dharman)
 1986 Vikram Henchman (Credited as Dharmaseelan)
 1988 Jeeva as Henchman (special appearance)
 1989 Chinnappadass as Waiter (special appearance)
 1989 Apoorva Sagodharargal as David (in a special appearance as a Henchman)
 1989 Vetri Vizha as Henchman (special appearance)
 1990 Nadigan Henchman (special appreance)
 1990 Sathriyan as Henchman (special appearance)
 1992 Singaravelan as Dharman (special appearance)
 1992 Amma Vanthachu as Himself (special appearance)
 1992 Thirumathi Palanisamy as Police Inspector 
 1993 Uzhaippali as Coolie (special appearance)
 1994 Nammavar (special appearance)
 1996 Indian as Freedom Fighter 
 2000 Kandukondain Kandukondain as Himself (special appearance)
 2001 Nila Kaalam as Police Inspector
 2001 Aalavandhan as Drug Dealer (special appearance)
 2002 Pammal K. Sambandam as Himself (special appearance)
 2003 Nala Damayanthi as Australian NRI (special appearance)
 2004 Singara Chennai 2005 Mumbai Xpress as Traffic Police (special appearance)
 2005 Maayavi as Himself (special appearance)

Extra Fighter
 1979 Kalyanaraman 1981 Kadal Meengal 1981 Savaal 1981 Netrikkan 1981 Ranuva Veeran 1982 Sakalakala Vallavan 1982 Pakkathu Veetu Roja 1982 Theeratha Vilayatu Pillai 1982 Pokkiri Raja 1983 Thudikkum Karangal 1983 Malaiyoor Mambattiyan 1983 Uyirullavarai Usha 1983 Soorakottai Singakutti 1983 Mundhanai Mudichu 1983 Thudikkum Karangal 1983 Valartha Kada 1984 Naan Mahaan Alla 1984 Nallavanukku Nallavan 1984 Thiruppam 1984 Naan Mahaan Alla 1984 Priyamudan Prabhu 1985 Uyarndha Ullam 1985 Paadum Vaanam Paadi 1985 Yaar? 1985 Chinna Veedu 1985 Nalla Thambi 1985 Ketti Melam 1985 Deivapiravi 1985 Arthamulla Aasaigal 1986 Viduthalai 1987 Anjatha SingamAwards
Won
 1990 Tamil Nadu State Film Award for Best Stunt Coordinator - Nadigan 1992 Cinema Express Award for Best Stunt Master - Thevar Magan 1993 Cinema Express Award for Best Stunt Master - Gentleman 1994 Tamil Nadu State Film Award for Best Stunt Coordinator – Mahanadi 1997 Dinakaran Award for Best Stunt Master - Many movies
 2002 Cinema Express Award for Best Stunt Master – Kannathil Muthamittal 2004 Film Today Award for Best Stunt Master - Aaytha Ezhuthu''

References

External links

20th-century Indian male actors
Tamil male actors
1961 births
2006 deaths
Indian action choreographers
Filmfare Awards winners
Male actors from Tamil Nadu